Imaginative Plain is the fourth studio album by Mainliner, released on April 25, 2001 by P.S.F. Records.

Reception

In writing for the Chicago Tribune, Kevin M. Williams noted that the music sounded as if "The Stooges were jamming with the MC5, with a guest appearance from Jimi Hendrix, and they've lost the set list, so they're just rocking out" and that "Kawabata makes a strong case for a slot in the shredder hall of fame, laying down sheets of precise, note-rich frenzy from his severely overdriven guitar." In a retrospective review, Tiny Mix Tapes awarded the album four-and-a-half out of five stars, saying "until experiencing Mainliner's Imaginative Plain, I’d never heard an album compressed within an inch of collapsing into a black hole, so dense that only pure distortion could escape."

Track listing

Personnel 
Adapted from the Imaginative Plain liner notes.

Mainliner
 Kawabata Makoto – electric guitar
 Asahito Nanjo – vocals, bass guitar, production
 Koji Shimura – drums

Production and additional personnel
 Bucci & D.I.O – cover art
 Jerome Genin - front cover photo
 Mainliner – arrangements

Release history

References

External links 
 Imaginative Plain at Discogs (list of releases)

2001 albums
Mainliner (band) albums
P.S.F. Records albums